Herbert "Bert" Heron (October 26, 1883 – January 7, 1968) was an American writer, actor, and poet. Heron is best known for founding the Forest Theater in 1910. He was the former mayor of Carmel-by-the-Sea, California for two terms in the 1920s. He lived in Carmel for 62 years.

Early life

Heron was born, as Herbert Heron Peet, on September 9, 1868, in Englewood, New Jersey. His parents were Gilead Smith Peet (1847-1885) and Jeannie Spring (1843-1921). He came from a background of writers and dramatists. On July 17, 1911, he changed his name to Herbert Heron in Superior Court because he wrote and was known under that name.

Career

Heron grew up in Los Angeles and attended Stanford University but left to go on the stage. He joined the Belasco Stock Company, the Crawley-Meatayer Company, and the Morosco Stock Company in southern California. This experience taught him how to be a  Shakespearean  actor. He performed in San Francisco and went to Frank Coppa's restaurant, known among  Bohemians in San Francisco. At Coppa's, he met George Sterling, who invited him down to the art colony at Carmel-by-the-Sea, California in 1908. There, he met James Franklin Devendorf, co-founder of the Carmel Development Company, who sold him a lot to build a house where he lived with his wife and daughter. His wife was Sara Opal Piontkowski Heron Search, the daughter of a Polish Count, whom he married in 1905.

In 1910, Heron approached Devendorf again to purchase another lot. This time it was in an area surrounded by oaks and pines, for an outdoor (open air) theater. Heron wanted to stage plays starring Carmel residents. At that time there were only three hundred residents. By February 1910, construction began on what would be called the Forest Theater with a platform stage and wooded benches. Devendorf paid the expenses knowing it would be good for Carmel. There was no electricity at the theater, so Heron used calcium floodlights that were brought by covered wagon from Monterey to light the stage.

On July 9, 1910, Heron put on the first of the annual theatrical productions at the Forest Theater. It was David, a biblical drama by Constance Lindsay Skinner under the direction of Garnet Holme of UC Berkeley. Heron was in the title role as David and writer Alice MacGowan as Astar. The play was reviewed in both Los Angeles and San Francisco, and was reported that over 1,000 theatergoers attended the production. The second play was the Twelfth Night, on July 3rd and 4th, 1911. Heron played the character Feste. He was part of the cultural circle that included Jack London, George Sterling, James Hopper, and Mary Hunter Austin, Alice MacGowan, and Sinclair Lewis.

In 1918, Heron opened the first Seven Arts bookstore, selling books, art materials, poetry, and antiques near the Forest Theater. In 1923, Heron commissioned Michael J. Murphy to build the Seven Arts Shop for he and Helena Conger at a new located on Ocean Avenue and Monte Verde Street, next to Edward G. Kuster's Carmel Weavers Studio. In 1925, he hired architect Albert B. Coats and builder Percy Parkes to build the Tudor Revival style building called the Seven Arts Building, located on Ocean Avenue and Lincoln Street. The building is now the Carmel Bay Company. The building accommodated several art organizations, including the Carmel Art Association, and the studio of photographer Edward Weston.

  

In the late 1920s, Heron, concerned about Carmel being commercialized, he entered city politics. He was elected to city council and served twice as mayor of Carmel. He was on Carmel's first planning commission.

In 1960, Heron finished his 50th year with the Forest Theater with his play, Pharaoh. By 1963, the theater had shown over 140 plays.

Plays

Other plays included:

Death
Heron died on January 7, 1968, in Carmel-by-the-Sea, California, at age 84. Funeral services were private and held in the Little Chapel By the Sea in Pacific Grove, California.

References

External links

 Herbert Heron Interview by George Robinson
 Downtown Conservation District Historic Property Survey
 Herbert Heron's 1903 Diary

1883 births
1968 deaths
People from Englewood, New Jersey
Writers from California
People from Carmel-by-the-Sea, California